CBCL may refer to:

 CBCL-FM, a radio station (93.5 FM) licensed to London, Ontario, Canada
 Common Business Communication Language
 Child Behavior Checklist, a multiple informant measure of child emotional and behavioral adjustment 
 CBCL (MIT), the Center for Biological and Computational Learning at MIT